A number of motor vessels have been named Tuscan Star, including:

 , a British cargo ship in service 1930–42
 , a British cargo ship in service 1947–48

Ship names